Macklin or MacKlin may refer to:

Places
 Macklin, Saskatchewan, a town in Canada

People with the surname Macklin or MacKlin:
Macklin (surname)

See also
 Maclean